Rhyacionia subtropica, the subtropical pine tip moth, is a species of moth of the family Tortricidae. It is found in the United States in southern Alabama and Florida. It has also been recorded from Cuba and Belize.

The wingspan is about 18 mm. It is a variable species. The forewing costa is brown with ten to twelve white spots along the length. There is a rusty brown patch at the apex and a V or Y shaped rusty brown patch along the costa. There are two generations per year, although a partial third generation may occur.

The larvae feed on Pinus elliottii, Pinus palustris, Pinus thunbergiana and Pinus caribaea. They attack the tips of their host plant.

References

Moths described in 1961
Eucosmini